Lists of East Asian surnames include common Chinese, Japanese, and Korean surnames, or family names.

List of common Chinese surnames
List of common Japanese surnames
List of Korean surnames

See also
East Asian name (disambiguation)

S